R (ProLife Alliance) v. BBC was a House of Lords case on the extent to which matters of good taste and decency are sufficient to justify the censorship of a party political broadcast.

The ProLife Alliance had submitted a video that showed the results of an abortion. The video was held to violate statutory regulations requiring public broadcasts to be decent. After extensive legal proceedings, the Court of Appeal ruled in favour of the ProLife Alliance. However, the decision was overturned by the House of Lords.

Facts
The ProLife Alliance is an advocacy group, and until 2004 a political party, that campaigns for "absolute respect for innocent human life from fertilisation until natural death and therefore opposes abortion, euthanasia, destructive embryo research and human cloning." (Paragraph 2 of the Court of Appeal judgment)

In 1997, the ProLife Alliance had enough support to be granted a Public Election Broadcast (PEB), subject to rules set out by the BBC, Independent Television Commission (ITC) and the Electoral Commission. The ProLife Alliance submitted a video that was graphic in nature. The video, the HL said, showed "the products of a suction abortion: tiny limbs, bloodied and dismembered, a separated head, their human shape and form plainly recognisable. There are some pictures showing the results of the procedures undertaken to procure an abortion at later stages... They are, I think, certainly disturbing to any person of ordinary sensibilities."

The broadcasters declined to show the video, on the grounds that it could have been offensive or disturbing to a large number of viewers. The ProLife Alliance sought permission for judicial review of their decision, which was refused. "A further application to the Court of Appeal was also refused. The appellant applied to the European Court of Human Rights, alleging a violation of Article 10 of the European Convention on Human Rights ("ECHR"). The application was declared inadmissible without the United Kingdom government being called on to put in observations." (Para. 7)

Laws applied
The Broadcasting Act 1990 makes the following provisions:

The following provisions of the Broadcasting Act 1996 are also important:

Court of Appeal
The Court of Appeal ruled in favour of the ProLife Alliance by stating that the BBC had acted unfairly in denying them one election broadcast in Wales.

House of Lords
The House of Lords overruled the Court of Appeal decision.

See also 
 BBC v Harper Collins
 BBC v Johns

References

Abortion case law
Censorship of broadcasting in the United Kingdom
United Kingdom free speech case law
House of Lords cases
2003 in case law
2003 in British law
BBC controversies